Jhankot Sign Language is a village sign language of the village of Jhankot in western Nepal. The Deaf make up 10% of the village, and Jhankot SL is widely known by the hearing community.

See also
Jumla Sign Language
Ghandruk Sign Language
Maunabudhuk–Bodhe Sign Language
Nepalese Sign Language

References

Village sign languages
Sign languages of Nepal
Languages of Karnali Province